Salò, or the 120 Days of Sodom, billed on-screen Pasolini's 120 Days of Sodom on English-language prints and commonly referred to as simply Salò, is a 1975 art horror film directed and co-written by Pier Paolo Pasolini. The film is a loose adaptation of the 1785 novel (first published in 1904) The 120 Days of Sodom by the Marquis de Sade, updating the story's setting to the World War II era. It was Pasolini's final film, being released three weeks after his murder.

The film focuses on four wealthy, corrupt Italian libertines in the time of the fascist Republic of Salò (1943–1945). The libertines kidnap 18 teenagers and subject them to four months of extreme violence, sadism, and sexual and psychological torture. The film explores themes of political corruption, consumerism, authoritarianism, nihilism, morality, capitalism, totalitarianism, sadism, sexuality, and fascism. The story is in four segments, inspired by Dante's Divine Comedy: the Anteinferno, the Circle of Manias, the Circle of Shit, and the Circle of Blood. The film also contains frequent references to and several discussions of Friedrich Nietzsche's 1887 book On the Genealogy of Morality, Ezra Pound's poem The Cantos, and Marcel Proust's novel sequence In Search of Lost Time.

Premiering at the Paris Film Festival on 23 November 1975, the film had a brief theatrical run in Italy before being banned in January 1976, and was released in the United States the following year on 3 October 1977. Because it depicts youths subjected to graphic violence, torture, sexual abuse, and murder, the film was controversial upon its release and has remained banned in many countries.

The confluence of thematic content in the film—ranging from the political and socio-historical, to psychological and sexual—has led to much critical discussion. It has been both praised and decried by various film historians and critics and was named the 65th-scariest film ever made by the Chicago Film Critics Association in 2006. It is also the subject of an entry in The Penguin Encyclopedia of Horror and the Supernatural (1986).

Plot

The film is separated into four segments with intertitles, inspired by Dante's Divine Comedy:

Anteinferno

In 1944, in the Republic of Salò, the Fascist-occupied portion of Italy, four wealthy men of power - the Duke, the Bishop, the Magistrate, and the President - agree to marry each other's daughters as the first step in a debauched ritual. They rule that when they get to the mansion their daughters must be completely naked at all times. They recruit four teenage boys to act as guards (dressed with uniforms of Decima Flottiglia MAS) and four young soldiers (called "studs", "cockmongers", or "fuckers"), who are chosen because of their large penises. The army and secret police is sent to round up many youths, of whom nine young men and nine young women are hand-picked and brought to a palace near Marzabotto. One of the boys tries to escape on the way, but is shot dead.

Circle of Manias / 

Accompanying the libertines at the palace are four middle-aged prostitutes, also collaborators, whose job it is to orchestrate debauched interludes for the men, who sadistically exploit their victims. During the many days at the palace, the four men devise increasingly abhorrent tortures and humiliations for their own pleasure. During breakfast, the daughters enter the dining hall naked to serve food. One of the studs trips and rapes a daughter in front of the crowd, who laugh at her cries of pain. Intrigued, the President moons several slaves before prompting the stud to perform anal sex on him and the Duke sings "". Signora Vaccari uses a mannequin to demonstrate to the young men and women how to properly masturbate a penis and one of the girls tries to escape, only to have her throat cut. Signora Vaccari continues with her story. Two victims named Sergio and Renata are forced to get married. The ceremony is interrupted when the Duke fondles several victims and sex workers. At the end, Sergio and Renata are forced to fondle each other and the men rape them to stop them from having sex with each other. During this, the Magistrate engages with the Duke in three-way intercourse.

On another day, the victims are forced to get naked and act like dogs. When one of the victims, Lamberto, refuses, the Magistrate whips him and tortures the President's daughter by tricking her into eating a slice of polenta containing nails.

Circle of Shit / 

Signora Maggi relates her troubled childhood and her coprophilia. As she tells her story, the President notices that one of the studs has an erection and fondles him; another stud uses a female victim's hand to masturbate himself. She also explains how she killed her mother over a dispute about her prostitution and Renata cries, remembering the murder of her own mother. The Duke, sexually excited at the sound of her cries, begins verbally abusing her. The Duke orders the guards and studs to undress her. During this, she begs God for death and the Duke punishes her by defecating on the floor and forcing her to eat his feces with a spoon. The President leaves to masturbate. Later, at a mock wedding reception for the Magistrate and Sergio, the victims are presented with a meal of human feces. During a search for the victim with the most beautiful buttocks, Franco is picked and promised death in the future.

Circle of Blood / 

Later, there is a Black Mass-like wedding between the studs and the men of power while the latter are dressed in drag. The men angrily order the children to laugh, but they are too grief-stricken to do so. The Pianist and Signora Vaccari tell dark jokes to make the victims laugh. The wedding ceremony ensues with each man of power exchanging rings with a stud. After the wedding, the Bishop consummates the marriage and receives intense anal sex from his stud. The Bishop then leaves to examine the captives in their rooms, where they start systematically betraying each other: Claudio reveals that Graziella is hiding a photograph, Graziella reveals that Eva and Antiniska are having a secret sexual affair. Victim Umberto is appointed to replace Ezio, who is shot to death for having sex with one of the staff.

Toward the end, the remaining victims are called out to determine which of them will be punished. Graziella is spared due to her betrayal of Eva, and Rino is spared due to his submissive relationship with the Duke. Those who are called are given a blue ribbon and sentenced to a painful death, while those who have not been called, as long as they kept collaborating with the libertines, can hope to return home. The victims huddle together and cry and pray in the bathroom. They are then taken outside and raped, tortured and murdered through methods such as branding, hanging, scalping, burning and having their tongues and eyes cut out, as each libertine takes his turn to watch as a voyeur. The soldiers shake hands and bid each other farewell. The Pianist, looking out an open window, suddenly realises with horror what atrocities are being committed and, climbing out, throws herself to her death.

Two young soldiers, who had witnessed and collaborated in all the atrocities, dance a simple waltz together; one asks the name of the other's girlfriend back at home.

Cast and characters
 

Masters
Paolo Bonacelli (dubbed by Giancarlo Vigorelli) as The Duke; tall, strongly built, bearded, chauvinistic, very sadistic and a fanatic fascist; enjoys tormenting female victims with verbal abuse and degrading them, his favorite victims being Renata and Fatimah. Highly sexually potent. Shows "loving" feelings for the male victim Rino and allows him to live at the end. Likes to talk about fascist and misanthropic philosophy.
 Giorgio Cataldi (dubbed by Giorgio Caproni) as The Bishop, the Duke's extremely sadistic brother; Writes down several victims' names for punishment. May have a soft spot for Graziella, and is in an apparently affectionate relationship with one of the studs. Likes to torture and mock-execute people.
 Uberto Paolo Quintavalle (dubbed by Aurelio Roncaglia) as The Magistrate; mustachioed sadomasochist; fit and balding; enjoys bullying the victims, yet shows joy from being sodomized. Very strict and cruel.
 Aldo Valletti (dubbed by Marco Bellocchio) as The President; scrawny, weak and crude. He enjoys dark and punning humor and painful penetration to himself and others. He is passionate about anal sex even when having sex with women and girls, refusing to have vaginal intercourse with them.

Daughters
 Tatiana Mogilansky – Magistrate's daughter married with the President. A victim of the bullying of the collaborationists and the studs. Once at the mansion is forced to be naked at all times. Raped and killed at the end.
 Susanna Radaelli – President's daughter married with the Duke. Victim of the collaborationists and the Magistrate. Raped at the end by collaborator Claudio (in a lost or deleted scene also by Bruno), and immediately after that is killed by hanging.
 Giuliana Orlandi – Duke's younger daughter married with the Bishop. Killed at the end. Is forced to remain completely naked at all times just like the other daughters. In a lost or deleted scene, she is raped by the unnamed collaborator and by victim-turned-collaborator Umberto and is shot.
 Liana Acquaviva – Duke's elder daughter married with the Magistrate. Like the other daughters is required to be completely naked for all 120 days. Raped by one of the studs and killed in the end; in a lost or deleted scene in an electric chair.

Storytellers
 Caterina Boratto as Signora Castelli; a prideful, cruel prostitute who jokes about horrible instances. Tells stories during the Circle of Blood.
 Elsa De Giorgi as Signora Maggi; a coprophiliac who finds no shame in defecating in front of others. Committed matricide for a nobleman. Tells stories during the Circle of Shit.
  (dubbed by Laura Betti; voice used in French dub) as Signora Vaccari; lively and polite, she was molested as a very young child, but enjoyed it. Tells stories during the Circle of Manias.
  as The Pianist; soft-spoken, she plays continuously during the day, but is secretly very distressed at the actions around her. Commits suicide during the final day.

Studs
 Rinaldo Missaglia – Like the Duke is strongly built, chauvinistic and very sadistic; enjoys tormenting and raping female victims and abusing them verbally and degrading them.
 Giuseppe Patruno – The calmest of the studs.
 Guido Galletti – With bisexual tendencies and has relations with the Bishop.
 Efisio Etzi – Most cruel and degenerate. Mistreats victims, especially women.

Collaborators
 Claudio Troccoli – A teenage but cruel guard and as depraved as the Masters.
 Fabrizio Menichini – Another teenager and quiet soldier recruited at the beginning of the film.
 Maurizio Valaguzza as Bruno, The Collaborator; teenager cruel like Claudio who befriends him.
 Ezio Manni – a quiet guard who falls in love with the Slave Girl. Like the Pianist is secretly very distressed at the actions around him. He is aware of his fate when he is found out and is shot to death while holding his fist in the air in a Socialist salute.

Servants
 Inès Pellegrini as the slave girl, a black slave in love with Ezio. Disobeyed orders by engaging in intercourse without the presence of the Masters. Is shot after Ezio.

Male victims
 Sergio Fascetti – Forced to marry, but kept from actual intercourse. He is then raped by the President. In the end, he is branded by the Bishop and killed. In a lost or deleted scene, he appears sit to a low chair and then shot.
 Bruno Musso as Carlo Porro; an outspoken boy who shows a foul mouth even to the Masters. One of the Magistrate's favorite victims of bullying. In the end, he is killed after having his left eye gouged out by the Magistrate (and also the other eye in a lost or deleted scene).
 Antonio Orlando – Killed after having his penis burned off by the President. In a lost or deleted scene, he appears killed by hanging.
 Claudio Cicchetti – Confesses to the Bishop about Graziella's photograph, leading to a chain of revealed secrets. Killed in the end.
 Franco Merli – Prideful and youthful. Tricked into his position with a promise of sex with an attractive girl. Said to have the most beautiful buttocks. Nearly killed midway through the film, but spared on a promise of a worse future death. He is killed at the end after having his tongue cut off by the President. In a lost or deleted scene, he appears killed by hanging.
 Umberto Chessari – First a victim but later recruited off-screen as a collaborator, and replaces Ezio after he is shot. Becomes drunk with the power over others as a collaborator and start to act like the other fascists (for example aiming at his former victim friends and saying  to them).
 Lamberto Book as Lamberto Gobbi; he refuses to eat like a dog and is whipped by the Magistrate. Also killed in the end.
 Gaspare di Jenno as Rino; a slightly masochistic homosexual and the Duke's favorite. Shows sexual feelings and submission for the Duke and is therefore not tortured like other victims. Is also later recruited off-screen.
 Marco Lucantoni as Ferruccio Tonna; son of a subversive family, he tries to escape from the truck before the arrival to the mansion, but he is shot by the fascists soldiers who escorted the truck.

Female victims
 Giuliana Melis – Is early on forced to simulate how to masturbate the male sex on a dummy, but fails to do it "right". Raped and killed at the end. In a lost or deleted scene, the Duke rapes her while two studs tear her off a nipple.
 Faridah Malik as Fatimah; a common victim of both the Duke's sexism and the Magistrate's bullying. In the end, she is scalped by the Magistrate.
 Graziella Aniceto – Finds her time at the Palace unbearable and is calmed by Eva, whom she betrays. She is left alive at the film's end along with Rino.
 Renata Moar – A God-fearing and especially wide-eyed innocent. Forced into the palace just not long after witnessing the death of her mother. She is forced to marry Sergio before being raped by the Duke. When she hears that they killed her mother, she begs God for death. The Duke enjoys tormenting her and at one point forces her to consume his feces. She is killed at the end after having her breasts burned by the President. In a lost or deleted scene, she appears killed by hanging.
 Benedetta Gaetani – Admired by the President because of her buttocks. Although she is not present in the blue ribbon ceremony, Benedetta is also killed in the massacre. In a lost or deleted scene, during the final tortures, the Bishop sticks pins in her anus.
 Olga Andreis as Eva; a soft-spoken girl who is friends with Graziella and in love with Antiniska. After Ezio's death, because of her delation, she doesn't appear again in the movie, leaving her fate unknown. In a lost or deleted scene, after Ezio's killing, she tries to escape from the castle. She is pursued by the four masters, who finally shot her.
 Dorit Henke as Doris; Beautiful and rebellious; the most undisciplined of the girls. She is killed at the end. In a lost or deleted scene, she is ripped by the Bishop.
 Antiniska Nemour – In a lesbian relationship with Eva. She is killed at the end.
 Anna Troccoli – Inexperienced, shocked and innocent. Attempts to run away, and gets her throat cut and the corpse is put on morbid display by a Catholic icon.

Character names 
The Masters are known only by their respective titles (Duke, Bishop, Magistrate, President), while the various youths are either unnamed or are referred to by their actors' real names. The exceptions are Maurizio Valaguzza (Bruno), Bruno Musso (Carlo Porro), Lamberto Book (Lamberto Gobbi), Gaspare di Jenno (Rino), Marco Lucantoni (Ferruccio Tonna), Faridah Malik (Fatimah), Olga Andreis (Eva), and Dorit Henke (Doris).

Production

Conception
Pasolini's writing collaborator Sergio Citti had originally been attached to direct the intended adaptation of the Marquis de Sade's The 120 Days of Sodom. During the creation of the first drafts of the script, Pasolini appealed to several of his usual collaborators, among them Citti, Claudio Masenza, Antonio Troisi and specially Pupi Avati.

While collaborating with Citti on the script, Pasolini was compelled to transpose the setting of Salò from 18th-century France (as depicted in de Sade's original book) to the last days of Benito Mussolini's regime in the Republic of Salò in the spring of 1944. Salò is a toponymical metonymy for the Italian Social Republic (RSI) (because Mussolini ruled from this northern town rather than from Rome), which was a puppet state of Nazi Germany. While writing the script, it was decided between Citti and Pasolini that the latter would direct the project, as Citti had planned to write a separate project after completing Salò. Pasolini noted his main contribution to Citti's original screenplay as being its "Dante-esque structure", which Pasolini felt had been de Sade's original intention with the source material.

In the film, almost no background is given on the tortured subjects and, for the most part, they almost never speak. Pasolini's depiction of the victims in such a manner was intended to demonstrate the physical body "as a commodity... the annulment of the personality of the Other." Specifically, Pasolini intended to depict what he described as an "anarchy of power", in which sex acts and physical abuse functioned as metaphor for the relationship between power and its subjects. Aside from this theme, Pasolini also described the film as being about the "nonexistence of history" as it is seen from Western culture and Marxism.

Trilogy of death
In contrast to his "Trilogy of Life" (Il Decameron, I racconti di Canterbury and Il fiore delle Mille e una notte), Pasolini initially planned The 120 days of Sodom and Salò as separate stories, but noting similarity between both concepts – and based on their experiences in the Republic of Salò – conceived the idea of Salò or the 120 Days of Sodom. Pasolini established that the violent scenes in Salò were symbolic and reduced the romanticism of his previous films, although knowing that once the film was premiered would be considered as damned. As a continuation, Pasolini planned to make a biographical film about the life of child murderer Gilles de Rais, but died.

Casting
Initially, Ninetto Davoli was chosen to play Claudio, a young collaborationist, but due to legal problems he had to decline, the role being replaced by Claudio Troccoli, a young man who had a similarity to Davoli in his first films. Pupi Avati, being the writer, is not officially accredited due also to legal problems. Most of the actors of the cast, although they were natural performers, were non-professionals with minimal or no prior on-camera acting experience. Many of them were models, cast for their willingness to appear naked on-screen.

Franco Merli was considered like a prototype of the Pasolinian boy. Ezio Manni remembers during filming: "The same with Franco Merli, the guy chosen for having the most beautiful butt. When they reward him by holding the gun to his head, he suddenly protested, he couldn’t handle that scene. And the assistant director had to go and give him a hug." 

Pasolini regular Franco Citti was to play one of the soldiers' studs, but he did not appear. Laura Betti was also going to play Signora Vaccari, but also because of legal problems and prior commitments to Novecento declined the role, though she doubled the voice of Hélène Surgère in post-production.

Uberto Paolo Quintavalle (the Magistrate) was a writer; he knew Pasolini working on the newspaper Corriere della Sera. He was chosen for the role because he had all "the characteristics of a decadent intellectual".

Aldo Valletti (the President) was a friend of Pasolini from the time of Accattone. Giorgio Cataldi (the bishop), another friend of Pasolini, was a clothes seller in Rome.

Paolo Bonacelli (the Duke) had participated in several small Italian productions of the 1950s and 1960s, and would later appear in several major Hollywood productions.

Filming
Several outdoor scenes were filmed in Villa Aldini, a neoclassical building on the hills of Bologna. The interiors were shot in Villa Sorra near Castelfranco Emilia. The noble hall of the building and the courtyard were filmed in the Cinecittà studios. The town on the Reno replaces the fictional location in Marzabotto.

The shooting, carried out mainly in the 16th-century Villa Gonzaga-Zani in Villimpenta in the spring of 1975, was difficult and involved scenes of homophilia, coprophagia and sadomasochism. The acts of torture in the courtyard caused some of the actors to suffer abrasions and burns. Actress Hélène Surgère described the film shoot as "unusual", with nearly 40 actors being on set at any given time, and Pasolini shooting "enormous" amounts of footage. She also noted the mood on the set as "paradoxically jovial and immature" in spite of the content. In-between working, the cast shared large meals of risotto and also had football games played against the crew of Bernardo Bertolucci's Novecento, which was being filmed nearby. It also marked the reconciliation between the then 34-year-old Bertolucci and his old mentor after several disagreements following Pasolini's criticism of Last Tango in Paris (1972) and his failure to defend it from drastic censorship measures.

During production, some reels were stolen and the thieves demanded a ransom for their return. Using doubles, the same scenes were reshot but from a different angle. At the trial for Pasolini's murder, it was hypothesized that Pasolini was told the film reels were discovered in Ostia Lido. He was led there by Pelosi, the accused, and fell victim to an ambush, where he died.

Post-production

Musical score
The original music corresponds to Ennio Morricone interpreted at the piano by Arnaldo Graziosi. Other non-original music was Carl Orff's Carmina Burana in Veris leta facies at the nearly end of the film during Circle of Blood. Other music was several Frédéric Chopin's pieces Preludes Op.28 nº 17 and nº4 and Valses Op. 34 nº 2 in La minor.

Dubbing 
Like most Italian films of the time, Salò was shot MOS (without direct sound), with all dialogue and foley effects dubbed in post-production. The controversy surrounding the production dissuaded the actors playing the Masters to return to loop their lines, so they were all re-dubbed by other (uncredited) actors. French actress Hélène Surgère (Vaccari) had her dialogue dubbed by Laura Betti.

Alternative endings
Pasolini was undecided on what type of conclusion the film should have, to the point of having conceived and shot four different endings: the first was a shot of a red flag in the wind with the words "Love You", but it was abandoned by the director because he thought it "too pompous" and "prone to the ethics of psychedelic youth", which he detested. The second showed all the actors, other than the four gentlemen, the director and his troupe perform a wild dance in a room of the villa furnished with red flags and the scene was filmed with the purpose of using it as a background scene during the credits, but was discarded because it appeared, in the eyes of Pasolini, chaotic and unsatisfactory. Another final scene, discovered years later and which was only in the initial draft of the script, showed, after the torture's end, the four gentlemen walk out of the house and drawing conclusions about the morality of the whole affair. Finally, keeping the idea of dance as the summation of carnage, Pasolini chose to mount the so-called final "Margherita", with the two young soldiers dancing.

Release
Salò premiered at the Paris Film Festival on 23 November 1975, three weeks following Pasolini's death. In Italy, the film was initially rejected for screening by the Italian censorship, but received approval on 23 December 1975. The approval, however, was withdrawn three weeks after the film's Italian release in January 1976 and it was formally banned. Worldwide distribution for the film was supplied by United Artists. In the United States, however, the film was given a limited release via Zebra Releasing Corporation on 3 October 1977.

Censorship

Salò has been banned in several countries, because of its graphic portrayals of rape, torture and murder—mainly of people thought to be younger than eighteen years of age. The film remains banned in several countries and sparked numerous debates among critics and censors about whether or not it constituted pornography due to its nudity and graphic depiction of sex acts.

The film was rejected by the British Board of Film Censors (BBFC) in January 1976. It was first screened at the Old Compton Street Cinema Club in Soho, London in 1977, in an uncut form and without certification from BBFC secretary James Ferman; the premises were raided by the Metropolitan Police after a few days. A cut version prepared under Ferman's supervision, again without formal certification, was subsequently screened under cinema club conditions for some years. In 2000, in an uncut form, the film was finally passed for theatrical and video distribution in the United Kingdom.

The film was not banned in the United States and received a limited release in October 1977; it was, however, banned in Ontario, Canada. In 1994, an undercover policeman in Cincinnati, Ohio, rented the film from a local gay bookstore and then arrested the owners for "pandering". A large group of artists, including Martin Scorsese and Alec Baldwin, and scholars signed a legal brief arguing the film's artistic merit; the Ohio state court dismissed the case because the police violated the owners' Fourth Amendment rights, without reaching the question of whether the film was obscene.

It was banned in Australia in 1976 for reasons of indecency. After a 17-year-long ban, the Australian Classification Board passed the film with a R-18+ (for 18 and older only) uncut for theatrical release in July 1993. However, the Australian Classification Review Board overturned this decision in February 1998 and banned the film outright, for "offensive cruelty with high impact, sexual violence and depictions of offensive and revolting fetishes". The film was then pulled from all Australian cinemas. Salò was resubmitted for classification in Australia in 2008, only to be rejected once again. The DVD print was apparently a modified version, causing outrage in the media over censorship and freedom of speech. In 2010, the film was submitted again and passed with an R18+ rating. According to the Australian Classification Board media release, the DVD was passed due to "the inclusion of 176 minutes of additional material which provided a context to the feature film." The media release also stated that "The Classification Board wishes to emphasise that this film is classified R18+ based on the fact that it contains additional material. Screening this film in a cinema without the additional material would constitute a breach of classification laws." The majority opinion of the board stated that the inclusion of additional material on the DVD "facilitates wider consideration of the context of the film which results in the impact being no more than high." This decision came under attack by FamilyVoice Australia (formerly the Festival of Light Australia), the Australian Christian Lobby and Liberal Party of Australia Senator Julian McGauran, who tried to have the ban reinstated, but the Board refused, stating "The film has aged plus there is bonus material that clearly shows it is fiction." The film was released on Blu-ray Disc and DVD on 8 September 2010.

In New Zealand, the film was originally banned in 1976. The ban was upheld in 1993. In 1997, special permission was granted for the film to be screened uncut at a film festival. In 2001, the DVD was finally passed uncut with an 'R18' rating.

Reception
The review aggregator website Rotten Tomatoes reports a 70% approval rating based on 40 reviews, with an average rating of 6.70/10. The site's consensus reads, "Salò, or the 120 Days of Sodom will strike some viewers as irredeemably depraved, but its unflinching view of human cruelty makes it impossible to ignore."

Director Michael Haneke named the film his fourth-favorite film when he voted for the 2002 Sight and Sound poll. Director Catherine Breillat and critic Joel David also voted for the film. David Cross and Gaspar Noé named it one of their favorite films. Rainer Werner Fassbinder also cited it as one of his 10 favorite films. A 2000 poll of critics conducted by The Village Voice named it the 89th-greatest film of the 20th century. Director John Waters said, "Salo is a beautiful film...it uses obscenity in an intelligent way...and it's about the pornography of power."

The film's reputation for pushing boundaries has led some critics to criticize or avoid it; the Time Out film guide, for example, deemed the film a "thoroughly objectionable piece of work," adding that it "offers no insights whatsoever into power, politics, history or sexuality." TV Guide gave the film a mixed review awarding it a score of 2.5/4, stating, "despite moments of undeniably brilliant insight, is nearly unwatchable, extremely disturbing, and often literally nauseous".

Upon the film's United States release, Vincent Canby of The New York Times wrote, "Salo is, I think, a perfect example of the kind of material that, theoretically, anyway, can be acceptable on paper but becomes so repugnant when visualized on the screen that it further dehumanizes the human spirit, which is supposed to be the artist's concern." In 2011 Roger Ebert wrote that he owned the film since its release on LaserDisc but had not watched it, citing the film's transgressive reputation. In 2011, David Haglund of Slate surveyed five film critics and three of them said that it was required viewing for any serious critic or cinephile. Haglund concluded that he still would not watch the film.

Jonathan Rosenbaum of the Chicago Reader wrote of the film: "Roland Barthes noted that in spite of all its objectionable elements (he pointed out that any film that renders Sade real and fascism unreal is doubly wrong), this film should be defended because it 'refuses to allow us to redeem ourselves.' It's certainly the film in which Pasolini's protest against the modern world finds its most extreme and anguished expression. Very hard to take, but in its own way an essential work."

Home media
The Criterion Collection first released the film in 1993 on LaserDisc, following with a DVD release in 1998. In 2011, The Criterion Collection released a newly restored version on Blu-ray and DVD in conjunction with Metro-Goldwyn-Mayer as a two-disc release with multiple interviews collected on the accompanying second disc.

Critical analysis
Salò has received critical analysis from film scholars, critics and others for its converging depictions of sexual violence and cross-referencing of historical and sociopolitical themes. Commenting on the film's prevalent sexual themes, horror film scholar Stephen Barber writes: "The core of Salò is the anus, and its narrative drive pivots around the act of sodomy. No scene of a sex act has been confirmed in the film until one of the libertines has approached its participants and sodomized the figure committing the act. The filmic material of Salò is one that compacts celluloid and feces, in Pasolini's desire to burst the limits of cinema, via the anally resonant eye of the film lens." Barber also notes that Pasolini's film reduces the extent of the storytelling sequences present in de Sade's The 120 Days of Sodom so that they "possess equal status" with the sadistic acts committed by the libertines.

Pasolini scholar Gian Annovi notes in the book Pier Paolo Pasolini: Performing Authorship (2007) that Salò is stylistically and thematically marked by a "link between Duchamp's Dada aesthetics and the perverse dynamics of desire", which, according to Annovi, became artistic points of interest for Pasolini in the early developments of Salò.

Legacy
Salò has earned a reputation among some film scholars for being the "sickest film of all time", with some citing it as an early progenitor of the extreme cinema subgenre, alongside the American film The Last House on the Left (1972).

Film scholar Matthias Frey notes that the cross-section between the film's thematic content and graphic visuals has resulted in it being considered both a horror film as well as an art film:

In 2006, the Chicago Film Critics Association named it the 65th-scariest film ever made.

In 2010, the Toronto International Film Festival placed it at no. 47 on its list of "The Essential 100 films".

In 2008, British opera director David McVicar and Swiss conductor Philippe Jordan produced a performance of the Richard Strauss opera Salome (1905) based on the film, setting it in a debauched palace in Nazi Germany, for the Royal Opera House in London, with Nadja Michael as Salome, Michaela Schuster as Herodias, Thomas Moser as Herod, Joseph Kaiser as Narraboth, and Michael Volle as Jokanaan. This performance was recorded by Jonathan Haswell and later that year was released on DVD by Opus Arte.

The Nikos Nikolaidis film The Zero Years (2005) has been compared to Salò.

The film is the subject of the documentary Salò: Fade to Black (2001) written by Mark Kermode and directed by Nigel Algar.

An exhibition of photographs by Fabian Cevallos depicting scenes which were edited out of the film was displayed in 2005 in Rome.

The film's performances by its teenage victims is the subject of Reunion; Salò (1998), an art installation by British artist, Adam Chodzko.

Italian filmmaker Giuseppe Bertolucci released the documentary Pasolini prossimo nostro (2006) based on an interview with Pasolini done on the set of Salò in 1975. The documentary also included photographs taken on the set of the film.

The buttock inspection scene was referenced by Yves Tumor on their music video for "God Is a Circle"

Notes

References

Works cited

Further reading
 Gary Indiana. Salò o le 120 giornate di Sodoma. London: British Film Institute, 2000.
 Jack Fritscher. "Toward an Understanding of Salo" , Drummer, 20, January 1978, pp, 66–67, reprinted in Jack Fritscher, Mapplethorpe, Assault with a Deadly Camera, Palm Drive Publishing, 1988, ; reprinted with historical introduction in Jack Fritscher, Gay San Francisco: Eyewitness Drummer, Palm Drive Publishing 2008, pp. 619–642.

Essential bibliography
 Roland Barthes. Sade/Fourier/Loyola. Trans. Richard Miller. Baltimore, Maryland: Johns Hopkins University Press, 1997.
 Maurice Blanchot. Lautréamont and Sade. Trans. Stuart Kendell and Michelle Kendell. Stanford, California: Stanford University Press, 2004.
 Simone de Beauvoir. Must We Burn Sade? Trans. Annette Michelson. In Donatien Alphonse François Marquis de Sade, The 120 Days of Sodom and Other Writings, trans. and eds. Austryn Wainhouse and Richard Seaver. New York City: Grove Press, 1966, pp. 3–64.
 Pierre Klossowski. Sade My Neighbor. Trans. Alphonso Lingis. Evanston, Illinois: Northwestern University Press, 1991.
 Philippe Sollers. Writing and the Experience of Limits. Trans. and eds. Philip Bernard and David Hayman. New York City: Columbia University Press, 1983.

External links

 
 
 
Salò an essay by John Powers at the Criterion Collection

Films originally rejected by the British Board of Film Classification
1975 films
1975 horror films
1975 drama films
1975 LGBT-related films
1970s political films
1975 war films
Italian drama films
Italian LGBT-related films
Italian political films
Italian war films
French drama films
French LGBT-related films
French political films
1970s Italian-language films
1970s French-language films
1970s German-language films
Adultery in films
Films about anti-fascism
Bisexuality-related films
Cross-dressing in film
Films about child sexual abuse
Films about fascists
Films about Fascist Italy
Films about pedophilia
Films about prostitution in Italy
Films about race and ethnicity
Films about rape
Films based on French novels
Films based on Inferno (Dante)
Films based on works by the Marquis de Sade
Films directed by Pier Paolo Pasolini
Films produced by Alberto Grimaldi
Films scored by Ennio Morricone
Films set in 1943
Films set in 1944
Films shot in Italy
Films set in Lombardy
Films shot in Rome
Incest in film
Lesbian-related films
LGBT-related drama films
Film controversies in Italy
Film controversies in the United States
Film controversies in the United Kingdom
Film controversies in Australia
Film controversies in New Zealand
Film controversies in Iran
Film controversies in Finland
Film censorship in Italy
Film censorship in the United States
Film censorship in the United Kingdom
Film censorship in Australia
Film censorship in New Zealand
Film censorship in Iran
Film censorship in Finland
Obscenity controversies in film
Sexual-related controversies in film
Film censorship
Same-sex marriage in film
Torture in films
United Artists films
Films about philosophy
Hell in popular culture
Matricide in fiction
Nudity in film
Films based on multiple works
Films shot at Cinecittà Studios
French World War II films
Italian World War II films
1970s Italian films
1970s French films